Pseudotetracha timberensis is a species of tiger beetle in the subfamily Cicindelinae that was described by Häckel & Anichtchenko in 2015, and is endemic to Australia.

References

Beetles described in 2015
Endemic fauna of Australia
Beetles of Australia